The Kotto River (or Koto River) is a tributary of the Oubangui River in the Central African Republic.

Its source is on the south side of the Bongo Massif, near Mount Toussoro on the border between the Central African Republic and Sudan. The river separates the Tondou Massif from the Mongos chain to the north. There are several rapids along its course.

The Kotto River gives its name to two of the Central African Republic's sixteen prefectures, Haute-Kotto and Basse-Kotto.

References

Rivers of the Central African Republic
Tributaries of the Ubangi River